Ibom kingdom was an Ibibio nation with its seat of government in Obot Okon Ita. This kingdom was located between present day Abia and Akwa Ibom states in Southeastern Nigeria. Around 1630, an Igbo group from Abiriba known as the Eze Agwu arrived to Ibom. This caused a long term conflict and stalemate known as the Aro-Ibibio Wars. The Ibom Kingdom is our ancient home which the Europeans tried to delete its name, history, EKPE, Obon culture and its NSIBIDI ancient writing.

Origin
The kingdom of Ibom originated by the settlement of the Ibibio people from Usangale in the Cameroons around the 15th century. Ibom is an old word used by the Efik / Ibibio / Annang /Eket people of Nigeria meaning the ancient universe, the cradle earth, or the cradle, original or ancient community from which others sprang forth. The word Ibom symbolizes the ancestral, the origin, the cradle, the source and the ancient community or place or area from which other communities or people sprang forth or originated.  Akwa Ibom State is one of the present two states created from the old Akwa Akpa kingdom, Cross River State being the sister state. The word IBO has no meaning in their native language, it was caved out or coined from Ibibio word: IBOM to IBO-(M) during the British manipulation of dividing Nigeria into 3 major tribes/regions, namely: Hausa, Yoruba and IBO.

Akwa

Akwa also spelled Aqua, meaning The Great One or The Essential One is believed to be the ancestor of the people of Ibibio and Efik. Kwa or Qua therefore means Essential One or Great One.  It is of no coincidence that their ancient Kingdom was originally known as Akwa Akpa.  The words Akwa, Aqua, Kwa, Qua are common names for places, rivers, in both Akwa Ibom State and in Cross River State.

It is now a town in Arochukwu, Abia state in Southeastern Nigeria still called Ibom. an Ibibio kingdom which last King Akpan Okon lost to the Arochukwu people after the Aro-Ibibio Wars, which the Arochukwu won with the combined Igbo and Akpa armies. Ibom is also where the famous Ibini Ukpabi oracle is located.

References

External links 
http://www.aro-okigbo.com/history_of_the_aros.htm
https://web.archive.org/web/20080828190518/http://www.aronetwork.org/others/confederancy.html
http://aronewsonline.org/html/Prologue.asp

Countries in precolonial Africa
Aros
History of Nigeria
Former monarchies of Africa
 
17th century in Africa
Ibibio
Towns in Abia State
Former countries in Africa
Ibibio people